Chrysaethe ochraceicollis is a species of beetle in the family Cerambycidae. It was described by Zajciw in 1965.

References

ochraceicollis
Beetles described in 1965